This is a list of the 6 members of the European Parliament for Luxembourg in the 1984 to 1989 session.

List

Party representation

Notes

Luxembourg 1984-1989
List
1984